Gustavo Egelhaaf (born 30 June 1983 in Hermosillo, Sonora, Mexico) is a Mexican actor known in his native country for his film roles. On television he has had notable roles in series such as El Vato (2016–2017), and El Chema (2016–2017). Despite having started having recurring roles in films, his first major role was in 2018, in the film Hasta que la boda nos separe, alongside Diana Bovio, and recently in Doblemente embarazada, alongside Maite Perroni.

Filmography

References

External links 
 

1983 births
Living people
Male actors from Sonora
Mexican male film actors
Mexican male telenovela actors
People from Hermosillo